Christian Damiano (born 9 March 1950) is a French former professional football player and manager.

Playing career 
As a player, Damiano was a defender. He played for the B team of the club in the early 1970s.

Managerial career 
Damiano stopped playing football in 1974, at the age of 24. From 1974 to 1983, he was simultaneously head of the youth academy and assistant manager of the first team of Nice. From 1983 to 1986, he would then coach Stade Raphaëlois. He would also have various roles at the French Football Federation in this time period.

In 1986, Damiano became a coach at INF Vichy, a football academy. However, after it closed in 1990, he went to work as a coach for its counterpart INF Clairefontaine for two years. From 1992 to 1999, Damiano was a coach at several youth teams of France. In 1999, he was the first-team manager of Nice, and also the assistant manager until 2000.

Damiano first moved to England in 2000 when he was appointed assistant to Jean Tigana at Fulham, and remained at the club until Tigana's departure in 2003. He then returned to work alongside Gérard Houllier again (as they had crossed paths as coaches in France youth teams), this time as an assistant coach at Liverpool, although he departed along with the manager in 2004. He was soon appointed to assist Steve Wigley at Southampton. He was briefly linked with the manager's job of the Australian national team, although he ultimately lost out to Guus Hiddink. Damiano would then go on to work as assistant manager under Claudio Ranieri from 2007 to 2012: he followed him at Parma, Juventus, Roma, and Inter Milan.

References

External links
 Profile at Liverpool FC website
 Profile at Southampton FC website

1950 births
Living people
People from Antibes
French footballers
Association football defenders
OGC Nice players
French football managers
OGC Nice non-playing staff
INF Vichy managers
INF Clairefontaine managers
OGC Nice managers
Fulham F.C. non-playing staff
Liverpool F.C. non-playing staff
Southampton F.C. non-playing staff
Juventus F.C. non-playing staff
A.S. Roma non-playing staff
Inter Milan non-playing staff
French expatriate football managers
Expatriate football managers in England
Expatriate football managers in Italy
French expatriate sportspeople in England
French expatriate sportspeople in Italy
Sportspeople from Alpes-Maritimes
Footballers from Provence-Alpes-Côte d'Azur